KRIB (1490 AM) is a radio station licensed to serve Mason City, Iowa. The station is owned by Alpha Media and airs an Adult Standards music format.

First on-air in 1948, the station was assigned the KRIB call letters by the Federal Communications Commission.

The Winter Dance Party 
KRIB was one of the first radio stations in Iowa to play rock and roll in the mid-1950s, thus attracting a young audience. In February 1959, the station was one of the sponsors of the Winter Dance Party at the Surf Ballroom in Clear Lake, Iowa, and the show's master of ceremonies was KRIB disc jockey Bob Hale. The show featured The Big Bopper, Ritchie Valens and Buddy Holly; infamously, all three perished in a plane crash just north of the Mason City airport that night.

Over sixty years later, KRIB still changes their music format during the week of the anniversary of the Winter Dance Party, playing hit songs of the late 1950s and early 1960s, with an emphasis on tunes from February 1959.

References

External links
KRIB official website
Three Eagles Communications

RIB
Mason City, Iowa
Adult standards radio stations in the United States